During the 1982–83 season Football Club Internazionale Milano competed in Serie A, Coppa Italia and UEFA Cup Winners' Cup.

Summary 

During summer in his 14th campaign as chairman, Fraizzoli appointed a new manager Rino Marchesi replacing Bersellini after 5 seasons with the club. The defensive line of the team was reinforced with defender Fulvio Collovati a 1982 FIFA World Cup champion player in exchange with A.C. Milan for three players Pasinato, Canuti and Serena. Also, the President transferred out Prohaska to Roma. The club discarded the transfer in of Platini despite a pre-agreement signed with the French midfielder in February 1978  then, he was transferred in by Juventus, instead Inter chose to bought Hansi Müller from VfB Stuttgart and  Juary from Avellino. During the campaign future club legend Zenga arrived to the squad, along with Massimo Pellegrini who made his debut on 12 December 1982, being the second youngest player ever lining-up in field for Inter after Edgardo Rebosio.

The team advanced to the UEFA Cup Winner's Cup quarterfinals stage only to be defeated by Real Madrid. Meanwhile, in league the squad finishes in third position several points behind Roma and Juventus. Also, in Coppa the club was eliminated in semifinals by Juventus.

Squad

Transfers

Competitions

Serie A

League table

Results by round

Matches

Coppa Italia

First round-Group 8

Matches

Eightfinals

Quarterfinals

Semifinals

UEFA Cup Winners' Cup

Round of 32

Eightfinals

Quarterfinals

Statistics

Squad statistics

Players statistics

See also

References

External links 
 

Inter Milan seasons
Inter Milan